Parvanachis is a genus of sea snails, marine gastropod mollusks in the family Columbellidae, the dove snails.

Species
Species within the genus Parvanachis include:
 Parvanachis adamsi deMaintenon, 2014
 Parvanachis bocapanensis Arias Ávila, 2021
 Parvanachis dichroma deMaintenon, 2014
 Parvanachis diminuta (C. B. Adams, 1852)
 Parvanachis forcellii Arias Ávila, 2021
 Parvanachis minibrunnea deMaintenon, 2014
 Parvanachis mullineri (Poorman, 1983)
 Parvanachis nigricans (G. B. Sowerby I, 1844)
 Parvanachis obesa (C. B. Adams, 1845)
 Parvanachis ostreicolaG.B.  (Sowerby III, 1882)
 Parvanachis paessleri (Strebel, 1905)
 Parvanachis pepecarrascoi Ortea & Espinosa, 2017
 Parvanachis pygmaea (G. B. Sowerby I, 1832)
Species brought into synonymy
 Parvanachis isabellei (d'Orbigny, 1839): synonym of Anachis isabellei (d'Orbigny, 1839)
 Parvanachis pulchella (Blainville, 1829): synonym of Falsuszafrona pulchella (Blainville, 1829)

References

External links
  Radwin G.E. (1968). New taxa of western Atlantic Columbellidae (Gastropoda, Prosobranchia). Proceedings of the Biological Society of Washington. 81: 143-150.
 deMaintenon M. J. (2014). Taxonomic revision of the species of Parvanachis Radwin, (Gastropoda: Columbellidae) from the Gulf of Panama. Zootaxa. 3753(3): 201-225.

Columbellidae